Elena Berta (born 15 July 1992) is an Italian sailor. She and Alice Sinno placed 19th in the women's 470 event at the 2016 Summer Olympics. and placed 13th in 470 at the 2020 Summer Olympics.

References

External links
 
 
 
 Elena Berta at Comitato Olimpico Nazionale Italiano 

1992 births
Living people
Italian female sailors (sport)
Olympic sailors of Italy
Sailors at the 2016 Summer Olympics – 470
Sailors at the 2020 Summer Olympics – 470
21st-century Italian women
Sportspeople from Rome